Camila Lins de Mello (born July 12, 2000 in Belo Horizonte) is a Brazilian swimmer.

At the 2018 José Finkel Trophy, she broke the South American record in 4×200m freestyle relay with a time of 7:50.57 along with Ana Carolina Vieira, Maria Paula Heitmann and Andressa Cholodovskis.

At the 2019 Pan American Games held in Lima, Peru, she won a silver medal in the mixed 4 × 100 metre freestyle relay, by participating at heats. She also finished 7th in the 200 metre individual medley.

References

Brazilian female medley swimmers
Living people
Brazilian female freestyle swimmers
2000 births
Sportspeople from Belo Horizonte
Swimmers at the 2019 Pan American Games
Pan American Games medalists in swimming
Pan American Games silver medalists for Brazil
South American Games medalists in swimming
South American Games gold medalists for Brazil
Medalists at the 2019 Pan American Games
21st-century Brazilian women